Rasbora dies is a species of ray-finned fish in the genus Rasbora.

References 

Rasboras
Freshwater fish of Borneo
Fish described in 2008
Taxa named by Maurice Kottelat